Perittopus yunnanensis is a species of Riffle bug from China.

Veliidae
Insects described in 2013
Insects of China